The Crailsheim Merlins, for sponsorships reasons named Hakro Merlins Crailsheim, is a professional basketball club based in Crailsheim, Germany. Established in 1986, the club plays in the Basketball Bundesliga (BBL), the highest professional league in Germany. The club is a part of the multi-sports club TSV Crailsheim. Home games are played in the Arena Hohenlohe, which has a capacity of 3,000 people.

History
The club was founded on 31 January 1986 by a group of students. Until 1994, the team was only active at the lower local leagues and had problems in finding a hall to play at. A year later, the club found a new home in the barracks of departed American armed forces. In 2001, the Merlins managed to promote to the German second division, now the ProA, for the first time. A new home arena was found again, in the form of a renovated market hall.

In the 2013–14 season Merlins promoted to the Basketball Bundesliga, by reaching the ProA Finals. The club managed to avoid relegation in its first season in the league, because Artland Dragons was relegated the club received a wild card. However, in the following 2015–16 season the team was relegated once again after finishing last. In the 2020-21 season, coach Tuomas Iisalo guided the Merlins to their first Bundesliga playoff appearance in club history. Iisalo left Crailsheim at the conclusion of the 2020-21 campaign, Sebastian Gleim was named the new head coach.

In the 2021–22 season, Crailsheim made its European debut as it was placed in the regular season of the FIBA Europe Cup. On 13 October 2021, the Merlins recorded an away win over Bakken Bears in their debut. The same season, the Merlins also reached the final of the 2021–22 BBL-Pokal, its first final appearance in the national cup. The Merlins eventually lost to 86–78 to ALBA Berlin.

Sponsorship names
Due to sponsorship reasons the team has been known as:
Proveo Merlins: 2007–2009
Hakro Merlins Crailsheim: 2018–present

Honours
BBL-Pokal
Runners-up (1): 2021–22
ProB
Winners (1): 2008–09

Players

Current roster

Notable players

Head coaches

Season by season

References

External links

Team profile at Eurobasket.com

Basketball teams established in 1986
1986 establishments in Germany
Basketball clubs in Baden-Württemberg